Michela Moioli (born 17 July 1995) is an Italian snowboarder. She has represented Italy at the 2014 Winter Olympics in Sochi, and at the 2018 Winter Olympics in PyeongChang, winning a gold medal. She competed at the 2022 Winter Olympics, in Women's snowboard cross.

Biography
Qualified young at the age of 18 for the Olympic final of the snowboardcross in Sochi 2014, a bad fall ousted her from the fight for the podium. As a result of this injury, she had to undergo a cruciate ligament surgery that caused her to close the World Cup competitive season prematurely.

World Cup

Overall

Podium

References

External links

1995 births
 Snowboarders at the 2014 Winter Olympics
 Snowboarders at the 2018 Winter Olympics
 Snowboarders at the 2022 Winter Olympics
 Living people
 Olympic snowboarders of Italy
 Italian female snowboarders
 Medalists at the 2018 Winter Olympics
 Medalists at the 2022 Winter Olympics
 Olympic gold medalists for Italy
 Olympic silver medalists for Italy
 Olympic medalists in snowboarding
Snowboarders of Gruppo Sportivo Esercito
People from Alzano Lombardo
Sportspeople from the Province of Bergamo
21st-century Italian women